Leland Stanford MacPhail Jr. (October 25, 1917 – November 8, 2012) was an American front-office executive in Major League Baseball. MacPhail was a baseball executive for 45 years, serving as the director of player personnel for the New York Yankees, the president and general manager of the Baltimore Orioles, chief aide to Commissioner of Baseball William Eckert, executive vice president and general manager of the Yankees, and president of the American League.

Four-generation baseball family
Born in Nashville, Tennessee, he was the son of Larry MacPhail (Leland S. MacPhail Sr.), front office executive with the Cincinnati Reds, Brooklyn Dodgers and the Yankees. Larry and Lee MacPhail are the only father-and-son pair to be inducted into the Baseball Hall of Fame. Lee was honored in 1998.

His brother Bill MacPhail was president of CBS Sports and later was president of CNN Sports, brought on by Ted Turner to create the department upon the network's launch.

Lee MacPhail's son Andy has been a senior executive with four MLB clubs: general manager of the Minnesota Twins (1986–94), president/CEO of the Chicago Cubs (1994–2006), president/baseball operations of the Orioles (2007–11), and president of the Philadelphia Phillies (2015–20). Son Lee MacPhail III had begun a career in baseball and was an executive with the Reading Phillies of the Eastern League upon his untimely death at age 27 in an automobile accident on February 18, 1969.  In addition, grandson Lee MacPhail IV has been active in baseball as a scout or scouting director for numerous teams, including the Orioles, Twins, New York Mets, Seattle Mariners, Cleveland Indians, Washington Nationals and Texas Rangers.

Front office career
Lee MacPhail graduated from Swarthmore College and entered baseball in his father's Brooklyn Dodger organization, became business manager of the Toronto Maple Leafs of the International League in 1942, then served in the United States Navy during World War II.

The younger MacPhail rose through the Yankees system, eventually becoming farm system director in the late 1940s (after his father sold his one-third share and left baseball) and contributing to the organization's seven World Series championships from 1949 to 1958. He then moved to the Baltimore Orioles front office as general manager and, later, club president. During MacPhail's seven-year stewardship (1959–65), the Orioles became pennant contenders in the American League, winning 612 of 1,118 games (.547) and finishing in the league's first division four times.  Led by Most Valuable Player Brooks Robinson, the 1964 Orioles finished only two games behind the pennant-winning Yankees.

At the time of his departure for the commissioner's office in November 1965, MacPhail and his successor, Harry Dalton, were beginning negotiations with the Reds for a blockbuster trade that would bring Frank Robinson to Baltimore; Robinson would lead the Orioles to the 1966 world championship and win the American League Triple Crown and Most Valuable Player award.

After a brief term as top aide to the new commissioner, Eckert, in 1965–66, MacPhail served as the Yankees' general manager from October 14, 1966, through the  season, a rebuilding phase of the Yanks marked by the promotion of Bobby Murcer and Thurman Munson to the club, but no pennants or postseason appearances. The Yankees compiled a record of 569–557 (.505) during MacPhail's term as GM, with one second-place finish (in ).

After the  season, in late October, MacPhail was elected the fifth American League president, serving from January 1, 1974, to December 31, 1983. In replacing Joe Cronin, he moved the league's headquarters to New York City from Boston.

Although no AL franchise moved during MacPhail's term, he was in office for the dawning of the free agency era in 1976, and nine of the 12 league clubs in existence in 1974 underwent ownership changes. MacPhail also oversaw the league's  expansion to 14 teams with the creation of the Toronto Blue Jays and the Seattle Mariners, and was credited with bringing an end to the 1981 baseball strike when he stepped in for the owners to handle stalled negotiations.  During his ten full years in office, the American League continued to struggle against the National League in All-Star Game competition: it lost the first nine midsummer classics it played under MacPhail's presidency, winning only in his last season, 1983, by a 13–3 score. The Junior Circuit compiled a 4–6 mark in World Series play over the same period.

MacPhail also played a major role in the Pine Tar Incident in 1983, where he ruled on a protested game stemming from a home run that had been taken away from Kansas City Royals slugger George Brett. After his retirement as AL president, MacPhail spent two final years in baseball as chairman of Major League Baseball's Player Relations Committee.

Later life
MacPhail lived in Delray Beach, Florida, where he died November 8, 2012, at his home. He was 95.  At time of his death he was the oldest living Hall of Famer.

Honors and awards

He was elected to the Baseball Hall of Fame in 1998, joining his father Larry MacPhail, who had been elected in 1978, as the only father and son members.

In 1966, he received the Sporting News Executive of the Year Award. MacPhail had spent  as assistant to the Commissioner of Baseball prior to taking over the Yankees' general manager post. The award was bestowed for his efforts in building the 1966 World Series champion Orioles.

The American League Championship Series Most Valuable Player Award is named for Lee MacPhail.

In 2013, the Bob Feller Act of Valor Award honored MacPhail as one of 37 Baseball Hall of Fame members for his service in the United States Navy during World War II.

Footnotes

External links

1917 births
2012 deaths
American League presidents
Baltimore Orioles executives
Baseball executives
Major League Baseball central office executives
Major League Baseball executives
Major League Baseball farm directors
Major League Baseball general managers
Major League Baseball team presidents
National Baseball Hall of Fame inductees
New York Yankees executives
People from Delray Beach, Florida
People from Nashville, Tennessee
Swarthmore College alumni
United States Navy personnel of World War II